Mufti Shahabuddin Popalzai is an Islamic cleric, Imam, Khatib and head of the regional moon-sighting committee at the historic Qasim Ali Khan Mosque, Peshawar, Khyber Pakhtunkhwa, Pakistan. The committee, whose existence predates the creation of Pakistan, traditionally declares the sighting of the Ramadan and Shawwal moons, resulting in the fasting and Eid in certain regions of Khyber Pakthunkhwa including Peshawar, although most of the rest of Pakistan follows the central Ruet-e-Hilal Committee.

Popalzai is also serving as the Emir of the Aalmi Majlis Tahaffuz Khatm-e-Nubuwwat Khyber Pakhtunkhwa chapter.

Biography
Mufti Popalzai is born into the Popalzai clan of Durrani tribe of Pashtuns in Peshawar. He studied Islamic studies at Islamia College Peshawar and later became a prominent cleric in Khyber Pakhtunkhwa.

Mufti Popalzai has large following in Khyber Pakhtunkhwa, Tribal Areas, and the northern tip of Balochistan province among Pashtuns.

References

Pakistani Sunni Muslim scholars of Islam
People from Peshawar
Living people
Year of birth missing (living people)
Islamia College University alumni
Pakistani Islamic religious leaders
Muslim missionaries
Aalmi Majlis Tahaffuz Khatm-e-Nubuwwat people
Deobandis